Oedura elegans, the elegant velvet gecko, is a species of gecko endemic to Queensland and New South Wales in Australia. It, along with two other species (Oedura lineata and Oedura picta), was first formally named in 2019.

References

Oedura
Geckos of Australia
Reptiles described in 2019
Taxa named by Conrad J. Hoskin